Michael Bowyer (April 24, 1943 – December 6, 2012), also known by the ring name Mike "The California Hippie" Boyette, was an American professional wrestler, who made his debut in 1966.

Early life
Boyette was born in Tucson, Arizona.  Prior to his career in wrestling, he became a judo champion while serving in the United States Marines and earned a place in the 1964 Olympic team in Tokyo, but broke his leg and had to give up his spot.

Professional wrestling career
In 1966, Boyette began his wrestling career and was trained by Eddie Sharkey and Verne Gagne. He became second in all three United States Tag Team title competitions. In the early 80's he was given a push in Southwest Championship Wrestling as Grenade Boyer, a heel character who could "explode" at any time. The character was not popular and Boyette was relegated to jobber. In 1985, Boyette wrestled in the Universal Wrestling Federation and had a total of 197 losses.

Boyette died in Alabama, survived by his daughter Kristi Bowyer and 2 sons, Lance & Steve. He had 7 grandchildren & 4 great grandchildren.

Championships and accomplishments
Gulf Coast Championship Wrestling
NWA Gulf Coast Heavyweight Championship (4 times)
NWA Mississippi Heavyweight Championship (1 time)
NWA Gulf Coast Tag Team Championship (3 times) – with Bearcat Brown, Frank Dalton and Ken Lucas
NWA United States Tag Team Championship (8 times) – with Cowboy Bob Kelly, Ken Lucas, Calvin Pullins (2), Mickey Doyle (2) and The Wrestling Pro (2)
 NWA Mid-America
NWA Mid-America Heavyweight Championship (1 time)
City of Mobile Heavyweight Championship (2 times)
NWA Tri-State Tag Team Championship (Alabama version) (1 time) – with Mickey Doyle

References
General

Specific

External links
"The Hippie" Mike Boyette (1943-2012)
Mike Boyette at GCCWhistory.com
Mike Boyette at Cagematch.net
Mike Boyette at Oklafan.com
Mike Boyette at Wrestlingdata.com
Professional wrestling record for Mike Boyette from The Internet Wrestling Database

American male professional wrestlers
1943 births
2012 deaths
Professional wrestlers from Arizona
United States Marines
People from Tucson, Arizona